.gw is the Internet country code top-level domain (ccTLD) for Guinea-Bissau.

The .gw country code top-level domain was delegated multiple times to different entities.

External links
 IANA .gw whois information
 NIC.GW

Country code top-level domains
Communications in Guinea-Bissau

sv:Toppdomän#G